Thomas C. Finnie (November 25, 1918 – October 17, 2003) was the first Director of Management and Technology for the Defense Mapping Agency. He was one of the initial eight Department of Defense planners who helped organize the agency. Finnie was working in mission control during the moon landing of Apollo 11.

Early life and education 
Finnie was born in Caseyville, Kentucky, son of Carroll Finnie, and Virginia Kellen. He earned a Bachelors in Science specializing in civil engineering from the University of Kentucky, and a Masters in Science specializing in business administration from George Washington University.

Military service 
Finnie enlisted in the Army on April 8, 1944. He commanded the 66th Engineer Topographic Company during several of its Pacific campaigns.

Government service 
In July 1937, he started working with the Department of Agriculture. In 1953, he took the position of Chief of the production and distribution plant of the Aeronautical Chart and Information Center. He became Technical Director of the ACIC in 1962, and held that position until 1972. Finnie then became the first Director of Management and Technology for the Defense Mapping Agency, until his retirement from the federal government in 1974.

Personal life 
Thomas married Evelyn Warren in Roane County, Tennessee, on July 20, 1940, and had two sons, Thomas and William.

Honors 
In 2001, Finnie was inducted in the National Imagery and Mapping Agency's hall of fame. In 2014, the U.S. Geospatial Intelligence Foundation renamed its lifetime achievement award, the Arthur C. Lundahl—Thomas C. Finnie Lifetime Achievement Award.

Posthumous donation of private collection to NGA 
Finnie's son William donated Finnie's collection of 30 artifacts, including 23 photos from the moon landings that NASA gave to Finnie in honor of the assistance his agencies gave to the landings, to the National Geospatial-Intelligence Agency.

Ancestry

References

United States Department of Defense officials
United States Army personnel of World War II
United States Department of Agriculture officials
1918 births
2003 deaths
United States Army officers